Highway 40 is an East-West Highway in Jordan. It starts at Azraq and connects it to Amman. Then it continues further west ending on Highway 65.

External links
Itinerary on Google Maps

Roads in Jordan